Paweł Kal (born July 9, 1989) is a Polish footballer who plays for Korona Kielce.

Career
Due to his health problems (precisely knee operation) he was forced to stop playing football.

Club
In February 2011, he was loaned to Olimpia Grudziądz on a half year deal.

International
He was a part of Poland national under-21 football team.

References

External links
 

Living people
1989 births
Sportspeople from Kielce
Association football defenders
Polish footballers
Korona Kielce players
Olimpia Grudziądz players
Ekstraklasa players